The following is a list of the highest-grossing films in Japan. This list only accounts for the films' box office earnings at cinemas and not their ancillary revenues (i.e. home video sales, video rentals, television broadcasts, or merchandise sales). Two tables are listed in terms of nominal gross revenue, while the two other tables are listed in terms of box office admissions.

Highest-grossing films

Box office revenue 
Among the films that have grossed over ¥10 billion in Japan, sixteen are Japanese films.

Box office admissions 
The following table lists high-grossing films by the number of box office admissions, which refers to the number of cinema tickets sold at the Japanese box office. Only films that have sold at least  tickets are listed. The list is not ranked, as the list is incomplete.

The adjusted gross revenue is calculated by multiplying the total number of admissions by the average 2021 ticket price. Admissions better reflect the popularity of older films, since they are less susceptible to the effects of inflation. This mainly affects films released prior the 1990s, as there has been very little Japanese ticket price inflation since the 1990s. Where the number of admissions is unknown, they are estimated by dividing the nominal gross revenue by the average ticket price in the year of release (or the distributor rentals by the average rental earnings per ticket) to provide an estimate.

Film franchises and film series

Box office revenue

Box office admissions

See also
 List of highest-grossing Japanese films
 Lists of highest-grossing films

Notes

References

Japan
Japanese film-related lists